Warszawa Stadion, in English Warsaw Stadium,  is a railway station in Warsaw, Poland, located in the district of Praga-Południe close to the National Stadium (Stadion Narodowy). The station has two side platforms flanking the suburban tracks of the Warsaw Cross-City Line. The platforms are used by regional trains run by Koleje Mazowieckie and Szybka Kolej Miejska. The station building was designed by Arseniusz Romanowicz and Piotr Szymaniak and opened between 1955 and 1958, to serve Stadion Dziesięciolecia. The station was renovated shortly before the Euro 2012 football championships. It is also close to the Stadion Narodowy metro station, which opened on 8 March 2015.

References

External links

Station article at kolej.one.pl

Railway stations in Poland opened in 1955
Stadion
Railway stations served by Koleje Mazowieckie
Railway stations served by Szybka Kolej Miejska (Warsaw)